Bilgi Assembly seat is one of 224 assembly constituencies in Karnataka State, in India. It is part of Bagalkot (Lok Sabha constituency).

Assembly Members

Mysore State
 1957: Rachappa Mallappa Desai, Indian National Congress
 1962: Rachappa Mallappa Desai, Indian National Congress
 1967: Rachappa Mallappa Desai, Indian National Congress
 1972: G. K. Maritammappa, Indian National Congress

Karnataka State
 1978:	Siddanagouda Somanagouda Patil, Indian National Congress (Indira)
 1983:	Siddanagouda Somanagouda Patil, Indian National Congress
 1985:	Tungal Baburaddi Venkappa, Janata Party
 1989:	Yalligutti Gangadharappa Gurusiddappa, Janata Dal
 1994:	Jagadish Timmanagouda Patil, Indian National Congress
 1999:	Jagadish Timmanagouda Patil, Indian National Congress
 2004:	Murugesh Rudrappa Nirani, Bharatiya Janata Party
 2008:	Murugesh Rudrappa Nirani, Bharatiya Janata Party
 2013:	Jagadish Timmanagouda Patil, Indian National Congress

See also
List of constituencies of the Karnataka Legislative Assembly

References

Assembly constituencies of Karnataka
Bagalkot district